Lubāna bint ʿAlī ibn al-Mahdī was an Abbasid princess, Arabic poet and the principal wife of caliph al-Amin. She was the daughter of Ali, a son of the third Abbasid caliph, al-Mahdi.

Ancestry
Her grandfather was al-Mahdi and her grandmother was Abbasid princess Raitah bint al-Saffah. She was the niece of Caliphs al-Hadi and Harun al-Rashid.

Her grandfather a-Mahdi married Raitah as his first wife after his return from Khurasan. She was the daughter of Caliph as-Saffah and his wife Umm Salamah, a Makhzumite. She gave birth to two sons, Ubaydallah and Ali ibn al-Mahdi.

Biography
Lubana was the daughter of Abbasid prince Ali ibn al-Mahdi and granddaughter of al-Mahdi. During the ending years of Harun al-Rashid's long reign many marriages took place between different members of Abbasid dynasty. Al-Amin is recorded as having two wives, Arib bint al-Ma'muniyyah, and Lubana bint Ali ibn al-Mahdi was noted for her exceptional beauty. Lubana was the member of influential Abbasid dynasty. She married Al-Amin when she was seventeen or eighteen years old. This marriage was political important for Al-Amin because his half brother had married daughter of Caliph  Al-Hadi. She was respected by her mother-in-law Zubaidah bint Ja'far. Lubana was also an Arabic poet.
 
However, Al-Amin died before the consummation of his marriage to Lubanah; her attested poetry includes a lament for his death: 
'Oh hero lying dead in the open, betrayed by his commanders and guards. I cry over you not for the loss of my comfort and companionship, but for your spear, your horse and your dreams. I cry over my lord who widowed me before our wedding night'.
 
Her husband was killed in 813, Very little is known about Lubana bint Ali ibn al-Mahdi after Al-Amin's death. She died in 820s.

Caliphs related to her
The caliphs who were related to her are:

References

Sources
 al-Masudi. The Meadows of Gold, The Abbasids. transl. Paul Lunde and Caroline Stone, Kegan Paul, London and New York, 1989.
 
 
 
 

8th-century births
9th-century deaths
Poets from the Abbasid Caliphate
9th-century Arabic poets
Wives of Abbasid caliphs
8th-century women from the Abbasid Caliphate
9th-century women from the Abbasid Caliphate
9th-century Arabs